Shirley Hubbard (18 February 1885 – 22 February 1962) was an English professional footballer who made 140 appearances in the Football League for Leicester City as a forward. He later served as player-manager of Ashby Town.

Career
After beginning his career with local Leicester clubs, Second Division club Leicester Fosse bought Hubbard out of the army to sign him on 22 April 1907. Over the course of the next six years he made 151 appearances and scored 39 goals for the club and helped the Foxes to promotion to the First Division at the end of the 1907–08 season. Hubbard departed Filbert Street for North Eastern League club Darlington in May 1913 and was playing for South Shields upon the outbreak of the First World War in 1914. During the war, he guested for Port Vale, Bloxwich Strollers, Birmingham and on two occasions for Leicester Fosse. Hubbard briefly resumed his professional career with the reformed Leicester City during the 1919–20 season and finished his Foxes career with 154 appearances and 40 goals. He took over as player-manager at Leicestershire Senior League club Ashby Town. Hubbard later returned to Leicester City as a coach prior to the Second World War.

Personal life 
As of 1901, Hubbard was working as a shoe finisher and enlisted in the Leicestershire Regiment on 14 July 1903. He was posted to India and served until April 1907. As of 1911, Hubbard was married with one child. In November 1914, three months after the outbreak of the First World War, Hubbard re-enlisted in the Leicestershire Regiment and was sent to the Western Front in February 1915. He saw action at Hooge, the Hohenzollern Redoubt, the Somme and during the Hundred Days Offensive. After his retirement from football, Hubbard remained on the sports scene and wrote a column in the local Leicestershire press.

Career statistics

Honours
Leicester Fosse
Football League Second Division second-place promotion: 1907–08

References

1885 births
1962 deaths
Footballers from Leicester
English footballers
Association football forwards
Association football inside forwards
Royal Leicestershire Regiment soldiers
Leicester City F.C. players
Darlington F.C. players
South Shields F.C. (1889) players
Port Vale F.C. wartime guest players
Leicester City F.C. wartime guest players
British Army personnel of World War I
Birmingham City F.C. wartime guest players
Association football coaches
Leicester City F.C. non-playing staff
English Football League players
Association football player-managers
English football managers
Military personnel from Leicester